Governor Gage may refer to:

Henry Gage (1852–1924), 20th Governor of California
Jack R. Gage (1899–1970), 25th Governor of Wyoming
Thomas Gage (1719–1787), Military Governor of Quebec from 1760 to 1763 and Governor of Massachusetts Bay from 1774 to 1775
Thomas Gage, 1st Viscount Gage (1700s–1754), rumoured appointee as Governor of Barbados in 1839